KDVD-LD,  virtual channel 50 (UHF digital channel 25), is a low-powered Nuestra Visión-affiliated television station licensed to Globe, Arizona. The station broadcasts from South Mountain and covers the Phoenix metropolitan area.

History
K30ES signed on February 8, 1995. It would later become KFPB-LD on January 28, 2009. Ownership then transferred from Linda C. Potyka to Globe LPTV. Until 2010, the station broadcast in analog on UHF channel 30, from its transmitter on Usery Mountain in Mesa, Arizona.

Subchannels
The station's digital channel is multiplexed:

From 2016 until June 2017, 50.3 aired programming from Comet TV. After Comet was dropped, KFPB-LD affiliated with This TV on 50.3, which moved from K38IZ-D 38.5.

References

External links
 
 

DVD-LD
This TV affiliates
Stadium (sports network) affiliates
TBD (TV network) affiliates
Television channels and stations established in 1995
Low-power television stations in the United States